Events from the year 1995 in Jordan.

Incumbents
Monarch: Hussein 
Prime Minister: Abdelsalam al-Majali (until 7 January), Zaid ibn Shaker (starting 7 January)

Events

The 7.3  Gulf of Aqaba earthquake shakes Egypt, Israel, Jordan, and Saudi Arabia with a maximum Mercalli intensity of VIII (Severe), killing eight and injuring 30, and generating a non-destructive tsunami.

Establishments

Jordan River Foundation

See also

 Years in Iraq
 Years in Syria
 Years in Saudi Arabia

References

 
1990s in Jordan
Jordan
Jordan
Years of the 20th century in Jordan